Ares 110 Hercules is a multi-role fast patrol boat made in Turkey. The Royal Qatar Coast Guard Command ordered and received ten boats of this type.

Characteristics

Made of advanced composite material, Ares 110 Hercules was built at Ares Shipyard.

The boat is powered by three MTU 12V2000M84 Diesel engines and three Rolls-Royce Kamewa 50A3 series waterjets. There are also two Caterpillar C4.4 Diesel engines as auxilary.

The patrol boat features two Aselsan 12.7 mm Stabilized Machine Gun with IR imaging and remote control capability (STAMP), as well as one Aselsan 30 mm Muhafız, stabilized remotely controlled naval automatic cannon.

She carries a rapid reaction boat of type Ares 24 Harpoon.

The boat is operated by seven officers and petties, and 16 sailors.

Operators
, ten boats were built and delivered to the Royal Qatar Coast Guard Commans.

References

2019 ships
Ships built in Antalya
Patrol boats
Ships of Qatar